Beaumont, City of Beaumont or Beaumont City is the principal town of the Beaumont commune in the Corail Arrondissement, in the Grand'Anse department of Haiti.

References

Populated places in Grand'Anse (department)